The 1998–99 season was the 29th season in the history of Paris Saint-Germain F.C. and the club's 25th consecutive season in the top flight of French football. In addition to the domestic league, Paris Saint-Germain participated in this season's editions of the Coupe de France, the Coupe de la Ligue, the Trophée des Champions, and the UEFA Cup Winners' Cup.

Players

First-team squad
Kalle Sundman,
Joona Rantalainen,
Tomás Vuorivirta,
Rasmus Yli-Ketola,
Aapo Karisalo,
Daniel Bothas,
Niilo Ijäs,
Eino Kurikka,
Benjamin Cotton,
Ted Uotila,
Luca Kuusiluoma

Pre-season and friendlies

Competitions

Overall record

Division 1

League table

Results summary

Results by round

Matches

Coupe de France

Coupe de la Ligue

Trophée des Champions

UEFA Cup Winners' Cup

First round

Statistics

Goalscorers

References

Paris Saint-Germain F.C. seasons
Paris Saint-Germain